Mathew and Stephanie McCleary et al., v. State of Washington (short form: McCleary v. Washington), commonly known as the McCleary Decision, was a lawsuit against the State of Washington. The case alleged that the state, in the body of the state legislature, had failed to meet the state constitutional duty (in Article IX, Section 1) "to make ample provision for the education of all children residing within its borders."

King County Superior Court
Judge John Erlick sided with the Plaintiffs, stating that the State was indeed failing to adequately provide for basic education, saying "State funding is not ample, it is not stable, and it is not dependable."

Washington State Supreme Court
On January 5, 2012, the Supreme Court agreed with the opinion of the King County Superior Court that the State was not fulfilling its obligation to fully fund education in the state, with some justices dissenting in part on the question of continued judicial oversight.

Subsequent developments
In the 2013 Legislative Session, the State Legislature increased school funding by 11.4% to a total of $15.2 billion. They also passed three major reform bills in an attempt to further comply with the McCleary ruling.

Despite these changes, the Supreme Court did not find the State in compliance. On January 9, 2014 the Supreme Court issued an order setting a deadline of April 30, 2014 for the legislature to come up with an adequate funding plan.

On August 13, 2015, the Supreme Court ordered a $100,000 a day fine. This money was to be placed in a special account that would be used to benefit public education. The Court also urged the Governor at the time, Jay Inslee, to call a special session of the legislature to pass a funding plan to bring the State into compliance.

On June 7, 2018, the Supreme Court declared the state had fully covered the funding of basic education, lifting the contempt order and $100,000 a day fine, ending any judicial oversight of the case.

On April 11, 2019, at least one school district (Spokane Public Schools) announced significant staffing cuts tied directly to the McCleary decision. Although the decision increased state funding of school districts it also reduced funding from local levies resulting in a projected shortfall of almost $31 million for the district in the 2019-20 school year. The net staff reduction of about 8% represented 325 paid positions, impacted either through layoff or reduction in hours.

References

External links
 

2012 in United States case law
Washington (state) state case law